is a Shinto shrine in Shimane Prefecture, Izumo, Shimane. It is a Shinto shrine in Izumo, Shimane. It is the 18th Shinto shrine in Izumo Province.

History 
The shrine was founded in 776

The priests of the shrine are said to be descendants of Ōkuninushi

It is mentioned in the Engishiki.

Description 
It has a 1300-year-old sacred tree

Annotations

References 

Shinto shrines in Shimane Prefecture
Beppyo shrines